Mount McEuen is a mountain which also gives its name to the surrounding rural locality in the South Burnett Region, Queensland, Australia.

Mt. McEuen rises to an elevation of 508 m (1667 ft), with the nearest peak known as The Bluff (469m elevation) only a short distance away (approx. 1.7 km).  Mt. McEuen rises to a prominent pointed peak in a shape that is clearly volcanic in origin, making it a significant local landmark.  It was used as a vantage point by surveyors in the earliest days of preparing subdivisions for closer settlement and farming.

References 

South Burnett Region
Localities in Queensland